Meeksi is a village in Räpina Parish, Põlva County, Estonia.

Before the administrative reform in 2017, Meeksi was the administrative centre of Meeksi Parish.

References

 

Villages in Põlva County